Admetula is a genus of sea snails, marine gastropod mollusks in the family Cancellariidae, the nutmeg snails.

Species
Species within the genus Admetula include:

 Admetula affluens Bouchet & Petit, 2008
 Admetula afra Petit & Harasewych, 2000
 Admetula atopodonta (Petit & Harasewych, 1986)
 Admetula bathynoma Bouchet & Petit, 2008
 Admetula bayeri Petit, 1976
 Admetula cornidei (Altimira, 1978)
 Admetula deroyae (Petit, 1970)
 Admetula emarginata Bouchet & Petit, 2008
 Admetula epula Petit & Harasewych, 1991
 Admetula formosa S.-I Huang & M.-H. Lin, 2020
 Admetula garrardi Petit, 1974
 Admetula gittenbergeri (Verhecken, 2002) n. comb.
 Admetula italica  (D'Ancona, 1872) 
 Admetula leechunfui S.-I Huang & M.-H. Lin, 2020
 Admetula lutea Bouchet & Petit, 2008
 Admetula marshalli Bouchet & Petit, 2008
 Admetula superstes (Finlay, 1930)
 Admetula vossi Petit, 1976
 Admetula yerenjii S.-I Huang & M.-H. Lin, 2020
Species brought into synonymy
 Admetula malacitana Vera-Peláez & Muñiz-Solis, 1995: synonym of Admetula italica (d'Ancona, 1872)

References

 Hemmen J. (2007). Recent Cancellariidae. Wiesbaden, 428pp
 Verhecken A. (2007) Revision of the Cancellariidae (Mollusca, Neogastropoda, Cancellarioidea) of the eastern Atlantic (40°N-40°S) and the Mediterranean; ZOOSYSTEMA • 2007 • 29 (2) © Publications Scientifi ques du Muséum national d’Histoire naturelle, Paris. 
 Verhecken A. (2011) The Cancellariidae of the Panglao Marine Biodiversity Project 2004 and the Panglao 2005 and Aurora 2007 deep sea cruises in the Philippines, with description of six new species (Neogastropoda, Cancellarioidea). Vita Malacologica 9: 1-60

Cancellariidae